Coastal Swamp Oak Forests, also known as Swamp Oak Floodplain Forests and Estuarine swamp oak forests, are scattered riparian forests found in southeastern Queensland to southeastern New South Wales, Australia that would predominantly feature Casuarina glauca (swamp oaks). They occur within the South Eastern Queensland, NSW North Coast, Sydney Basin, or South East Corner bioregions.

Geography
Only about 26% of their original extent remaining, Coastal Swamp Oak Forests generally occur on light or alluvial soil on coastal flats, floodplains, drainage lines, lake margins, wetlands and estuarine fringes where soils are at least at times saturated, marshy or overflowed. Some may occur on coastal dune swales or flats. Having a dense to sparse tree layer, the community is mostly found as disjointed residue patches along the coast between Curtis Island (south-east Queensland), north of Gladstone, and Bermagui (southern New South Wales), up to 50 m above sea level (ASL) but usually less than 20 m ASL and they are usually within 30km of the coast, but in several areas, such as along tidal river catchments, the community can be present more than 100km inland.

Major presence include: around 350 ha on the Tweed lowlands; to a lesser degree than 650 ha on the lower Clarence floodplain; less than 400 ha on the lower Macleay floodplain; less than 3,200 ha in the Hunter Valley; less than 5,200 ha in the Sydney and South Coast region and less than 1,000 ha in the Eden region. The community's composition may alter from open forests to low woodlands, scrubs or reed lands with scattered trees.

Ecology
Although swamp oaks are the principal trees that occur in the canopy, there also exist many other species such as, Acmena smithii, Alphitonia excelsa, Melaleuca salicina, Cupaniopsis anacardioides, Glochidion ferdinandi, Parsonsia straminea and at times Melaleuca spp., where they shape a sub-canopy layer. 

The saline understorey consists of Baumea juncea, Alexfloydia repens, Baumea juncea, Juncus kraussii, Phragmites australis, Selliera radicans, Cynodon dactylon, Phragmites australis, Parsonsia straminea, Geitonoplesium cymosum, Stephania japonica and Suaeda australis, with freshwater species being Blechnum indicum, Carex appressa, Gahnia clarkei, Centella asiatica, Oplismenus imbecillis, Commelina cyanea, Hypolepis muelleri, Persicaria decipiens, Lomandra longifolia, Microlaena stipoides and Viola banksii. The total canopy cover is least 10%.

Biodiversity
The animals that occupy the community also dwell in conterminous wetlands, grasslands, woodlands and forests. The animals include bats, possums, bandicoots, birds, frogs, turtles and other reptiles. Mammals include Cercartetus nanus, Myotis macropus, Phascogale tapoatafa, Pteropus poliocephalus, Syconycteris australis, Phascolarctos cinereus, Antechinus stuartii, Perameles nasuta, Potorous tridactylus, Pseudomys novaehollandiae and Rattus lutreolus. 

Reptiles present are, Cyclodomorphus michaeli, Egernia mcpheei, Boiga irregularis, Hemiaspis signata, Hoplocephalus bitorquatus, Pseudechis porphyriacus, Tropidechis carinatus, Chelodina longicollis, Emydura macquarii, Elseya albagula, Elusor macrurus and Wollumbinia georgesi.

See also
River-flat eucalypt forest

References

Endangered ecological communities
Geography of Sydney
Remnant urban bushland
Vegetation of Australia
Ecoregions of New South Wales
Ecoregions of Queensland
Sclerophyll forests
Casuarina